During the Parade of Nations at the 2017 Asian Winter Games opening ceremony, held on 19 February 2017, 30 athletes bearing the flags of their respective nations led their national delegations as they paraded into the Sapporo Dome in the host city of Sapporo, Japan.

Countries and flagbearers
Athletes entered the stadium in English alphabetical order. However, Kuwaiti athletes entered after the alphabetically last team (Vietnam) as Independent Olympic Athletes due to the suspension of the Kuwait Olympic Committee. They were followed by guest invitees Australia and New Zealand, with the Japanese team entering last as the host nation.

The names of the nations were announced first in Japanese and then English. While the placards displayed only English, a screen in the stadium displayed both Japanese and English.

Below is a list of parading countries and their announced flag bearer, in the same order as the parade. This is sortable by country name, flag bearer's name, or flag bearer's sport.

 Australia and New Zealand's placards read simply "Australia" and "New Zealand", but were announced and displayed on the stadium's screen as "Guest Australia" and "Guest New Zealand".

References

Parade of Nations